Asom Yuva Parishad (translation: Assam Youth Association)  is the youth wing of Asom Gana Parishad. The president of AYP is Jitu Borgohain.

Youth wings of political parties in India
Asom Gana Parishad
Year of establishment missing